Thinethavone "Tim" Soutphommasane (born 1982) is an Australian academic, social commentator and former public servant. He was Australia's Race Discrimination Commissioner at the Australian Human Rights Commission from 2013 to 2018. He has previously been a political staffer for Bob Carr, a columnist with The Age and The Australian newspapers, a lecturer at Sydney and Monash Universities, and a research fellow with the Per Capita think tank. He is a member of the board of the National Australia Day Council, and an ex officio member of the Council for Multicultural Australia.

Early life
Soutphommasane was born in Montpellier, France in 1982 to Chinese and Lao parents who had fled Laos as refugees in 1975.

His family was resettled by the Family Reunion Program of the Australian Department of Immigration and Ethnic Affairs to Sydney's south-western suburbs in 1985, where he was raised. He was educated at Hurlstone Agricultural High School.

Academia
Soutphommasane graduated from the University of Sydney with a first-class honours degree. He was then a Commonwealth Scholar and Jowett Senior Scholar at Balliol College of the University of Oxford where he completed a Master of Philosophy with distinction and a Doctor of Philosophy in political theory.

From 2010 to 2012 he was a Lecturer in Australian Studies and a Research Fellow at the National Centre for Australian Studies of Monash University. He was one of six chief investigators on an Australian Research Council Linkage project studying the history of ANZAC Day.

In 2019, he was appointed Professor of Practice in Sociology and Political Theory at the University of Sydney to teach human rights related theory.

Journalism
Soutphommasane was a regular writer for The Australian newspaper, to which he contributed feature articles and the Ask the Philosopher column each Saturday. He also wrote for The Monthly magazine.  While living in England, Soutphommasane was a freelance journalist, contributing blog entries to The Guardian and The Financial Times, as well as opinion pieces and reviews to The Spectator, The Australian, The Sydney Morning Herald and The Age.

Writing
Soutphommasane's first book Reclaiming Patriotism: Nation-Building for Australian Progressives was published in 2009.  Loosely based on research undertaken toward his doctoral thesis, the book argues that people with progressive politics must re-engage with ideas of patriotism and national identity, which Soutphommasane claims were surrendered to the right during the Prime Ministership of John Howard.

His The Virtuous Citizen: Patriotism in a Multicultural Society was published in 2012 and Don't Go Back To Where You Came From: Why Multiculturalism Works, published the next year, won the NSW Premier's Literary Award in the 'Community Relations Commission Award' section.

He was also co-editor (with Nick Dyrenfurth) of All That's Left: What Labor Should Stand For (New South Books, 2010).

Other roles

Soutphommasane was appointed to the Council for Multicultural Australia in August 2011.

Political activity
Soutphommasane joined the Australian Labor Party in 1998, aged 15. He later worked on the speechwriting staff of then New South Wales Premier Bob Carr, and in late 2007 he returned from Oxford to work as a research officer in the office of Kevin Rudd during that year's federal election campaign.

Books
Reclaiming Patriotism: Nation-Building for Australian Progressives (Port Melb: Cambridge University Press, 2009) Paperback, 
Don't Go Back To Where You Came From: Why Multiculturalism Works (New South Books, 2012)
The Virtuous Citizen: Patriotism in a Multicultural Society (Cambridge University Press, 2012)
I'm Not Racist but... (NewSouth Publishing, 2015)
On Hate (Melbourne University Press, 2019)

References

External links

 
 Race discrimination commissioner profile

Australian columnists
Australian people of Laotian descent
Living people
1982 births
University of Sydney alumni
French emigrants to Australia
Alumni of Balliol College, Oxford
Academic staff of Monash University
Australian public servants